Lawrence K. Critchfield  (January 6, 1908 – June 30, 1965) was an American football guard  who played one season in the National Football League with the Pittsburgh Pirates. He played college football at Grove City College.

References

External links
Just Sports Stats

1908 births
1965 deaths
Players of American football from Pennsylvania
American football guards
Grove City Wolverines football players
Pittsburgh Pirates (football) players
People from Somerset County, Pennsylvania